Beverly Howard may refer to:
 Beverly Crusher, birth name of fictional character Beverly Howard in the TV series Star Trek: The Next Generation